Hornik is a surname from Czech or Slovak, meaning 'miner'. Notable people with the surname include:
 David Hornik, American venture capitalist and philanthropist 
 Freddie Hornik, Czech-born British fashion entrepreneur
 Gottfried Hornik, Austrian operatic baritone
 Jacob Hornik, Israeli professor in marketing and communications
 Milos Hornik, Slovak volleyballer
 P. David Hornik, American-born writer and translator living in Israel

References

Czech-language surnames
Slovak-language surnames